New Zealand competed at the 2003 World Athletics Championships. Their best placing was fifth, achieved by Valerie Vili in the Women's shot put. The men's 4x100m relay team broke the national record in their heat, but did not advance to the semi-finals.

Entrants

Key
Q = Qualified for the next round by placing (track events) or automatic qualifying target (field events)
q = Qualified for the next round as a fastest loser (track events) or by position (field events)
AR = Area (Continental) Record
NR = National record
PB = Personal best
SB = Season best
- = Round not applicable for the event

Individual events

Relay events

References

Nations at the 2003 World Championships in Athletics
New Zealand at the World Championships in Athletics
World Championships in Athletics